Gerakari is a village and a community of the Agia municipality. The 2011 census recorded 266 inhabitants in the village. The community of Gerakari covers an area of 11.31 km2.

Population
According to the 2011 census, the population of the settlement of Gerakari was 266 people, a decrease of almost 20% compared with the population of the previous census of 2001.

History
The village is the site of the ancient city of Amyrus.

See also
 List of settlements in the Larissa regional unit

References

Populated places in Larissa (regional unit)